Wilbarger County is a county located in the North Texas region of the U.S. state of Texas. As of the 2020 census, the population was 12,887. The county seat is Vernon. The county was created in 1858 and later organized in 1881. Wilbarger is named for Josiah Pugh Wilbarger and Mathias Wilbarger, two early settlers.

Geography

Major highways
  U.S. Highway 70
  U.S. Highway 183
  U.S. Highway 283
  U.S. Highway 287

Adjacent counties
 Tillman County, Oklahoma (north)
 Wichita County (east)
 Baylor County (south)
 Foard County (west)
 Hardeman County (west)
 Jackson County, Oklahoma (northwest)

Demographics

Census-designated places
 Harrold
 Lockett
 Oklaunion

Population

Note: the US Census treats Hispanic/Latino as an ethnic category. This table excludes Latinos from the racial categories and assigns them to a separate category. Hispanics/Latinos can be of any race.

As of the census of 2000,  14,676 people, 5,537 households, and 3,748 families were residing in the county.  The population density was 15 people/sq mi (6/km2).  The 6,371 housing units averaged 7/sq mi (3/km2).  The racial makeup of the county was 78.17% White, 8.86% African American, 0.66% Native American, 0.63% Asian,  9.76% from other races, and 1.91% from two or more races.  About 20.54% of the population were Hispanic or Latino of any race.

Of the 5,537 households, 32.20% had children under 18 living with them, 53.10% were married couples living together, 10.80% had a female householder with no husband present, and 32.30% were not families.  About 29.00% of all households were made up of individuals, and 14.90% had someone living alone who was 65  or older.  The average household size was 2.48, and the average family size was 3.07.

In the county, the age distribution was 27.90% under 18, 9.50% from 18 to 24, 24.80% from 25 to 44, 21.60% from 45 to 64, and 16.20% who were 65  or older.  The median age was 36 years. For every 100 females, there were 98.00 males.  For every 100 females age 18 and over, there were 91.70 males.
Males had a median income of $26,001 versus $19,620 for females. The per capita income for the county was $16,520. About 9.00% of families and 13.10% of the population were below the poverty line, including 16.00% of those under age 18 and 13.30% of those age 65 or over.

Communities

City
 Vernon (county seat)

Unincorporated communities
 Grayback
 Odell

Education
School districts serving sections of the county include:
 Chillicothe Independent School District
 Harrold Independent School District
 Northside Independent School District
 Vernon Independent School District

The county is in the service area of Vernon College.

Notable people
 Clyde Gates, wide receiver for the New York Jets
 Jack English Hightower, Memphis, Texas, native; former member of both houses of the Texas State Legislature, and former U.S. Representative
 Roy Orbison, singer/songwriter, was born in Wilbarger County.
 Daryl Richardson, running back for the St. Louis Rams
 Bernard Scott, running back for the Cincinnati Bengals
 Jack Teagarden, bandleader and trombonist
 John Clay Wolfe, American radio personality who began his career in Wilbarger County on KSEY

Politics

See also

 List of museums in North Texas
 National Register of Historic Places listings in Wilbarger County, Texas
 Recorded Texas Historic Landmarks in Wilbarger County

References

External links
 Vernon Daily Record - Wilbarger County News
 Wilbarger County, Texas Official Website
 
 Josiah Wilbarger's entry in the Biographical Encyclopedia of Texas hosted by the Portal to Texas History.
 Wilbarger County Profile from the Texas Association of Counties

 
1881 establishments in Texas
Populated places established in 1881